The Riasg Buidhe Cross is a cross standing in the gardens of Colonsay House on the Inner Hebridean island of Colonsay, Scotland.

History
Dating from the 7th or 8th century, the cross stood at Riasg Buidhe in what was recorded as an old burial ground until 1870, when it was taken to Colonsay House close to Kiloran which was built in 1722.  The cross was placed beside Tobar Oran and in the vicinity of the now lost Chapel of St. Oran.

One side of the cross shows a solemn face with distinctive eyebrows and ears, below which extends a long thin neck.  The arms of the figure - presumably Christ - are represented by two opposite spirals, and the lower part of the body ends in a fishtail, perhaps referring to the ancient Christian tradition of representing Christ as a fish.

The other side of the cross may be intended to represent a penis, as some have suggested.

References
 David M. Wilson: The Art of the Picts - Sculpture and Metalwork in early medieval Scotland, London,  Thames and Hudson 2004, .
Kevin Byrne: Lonely Colonsay - Island at the Edge, Colonsay, House of Lochar 2010,

External links

Archaeological sites in the Southern Inner Hebrides
Colonsay
Buildings and structures in Argyll and Bute
Scotland in the Early Middle Ages
Monuments and memorials in Scotland